IEEE Transactions on Multimedia is a bimonthly peer-reviewed scientific journal covering multimedia technology and applications. It was established in 1999 and is published by the IEEE Computer Society, IEEE Communications Society, IEEE Circuits and Systems Society, and IEEE Signal Processing Society. The editor-in-chief is Chang Wen Chen (State University of New York at Buffalo. According to the Journal Citation Reports, the journal has a 2018 impact factor of 5.452.

References

External links 
 

Transactions on Multimedia
Computer science journals
Engineering journals
Bimonthly journals
Publications established in 1999
English-language journals